Aq Qabaq may refer to:
 Aq Qabaq-e Golshad Kandi
 Aq Qabaq-e Olya
 Aq Qabaq-e Sofla
 Aq Qabaq-e Vosta